Ardlamont House is a Georgian estate house lying at the tip of the Cowal peninsula,  south of Kames, in Argyll, Scotland. The house was built c.1820 for Major General John Lamont, 19th of Lamont. It is designated as a Category B listed building by Historic Environment Scotland. The two-storey house is harled. The main block has a piended (hipped) slate roof, while the single-storey wings have skew (sloping) gables.

A well-preserved obelisk sundial is located in the garden.

The Ardlamont Estate was the location of the Ardlamont murder in 1893.

References

External links
Ardlamont House, Royal Commission on the Ancient and Historical Monuments of Scotland

Houses completed in 1820
1820 in Scotland
Category B listed houses in Scotland
Georgian architecture in Scotland
Category B listed buildings in Argyll and Bute
Clan Lamont